Maunu is a suburb in the south west of Whangārei in Northland, New Zealand. A volcanic hill to the west is also called Maunu and has a peak 395 m above sea level. State Highway 14 runs through the suburb.

Demographics
Maunu is split between two statistical areas in the 2018 census. Pukenui is a mostly rural area on the west of the suburb, Maunu-Horohora is mostly urban and goes east towards central Whangārei.

Pukenui

Pukenui had a population of 2,040 at the 2018 New Zealand census, an increase of 402 people (24.5%) since the 2013 census, and an increase of 738 people (56.7%) since the 2006 census. There were 735 households, comprising 966 males and 1,077 females, giving a sex ratio of 0.9 males per female. The median age was 46.7 years (compared with 37.4 years nationally), with 384 people (18.8%) aged under 15 years, 288 (14.1%) aged 15 to 29, 966 (47.4%) aged 30 to 64, and 402 (19.7%) aged 65 or older.

Ethnicities were 88.5% European/Pākehā, 11.2% Māori, 1.2% Pacific peoples, 6.9% Asian, and 2.1% other ethnicities. People may identify with more than one ethnicity.

The percentage of people born overseas was 20.9, compared with 27.1% nationally.

Although some people chose not to answer the census's question about religious affiliation, 47.5% had no religion, 42.8% were Christian, 1.2% were Hindu, 0.3% were Muslim, 0.7% were Buddhist and 1.6% had other religions.

Of those at least 15 years old, 387 (23.4%) people had a bachelor's or higher degree, and 246 (14.9%) people had no formal qualifications. The median income was $38,400, compared with $31,800 nationally. 417 people (25.2%) earned over $70,000 compared to 17.2% nationally. The employment status of those at least 15 was that 786 (47.5%) people were employed full-time, 300 (18.1%) were part-time, and 39 (2.4%) were unemployed.

Maunu-Horohora 

Maunu-Horahora had a population of 3,276 at the 2018 New Zealand census, an increase of 273 people (9.1%) since the 2013 census, and an increase of 345 people (11.8%) since the 2006 census. There were 1,206 households, comprising 1,578 males and 1,701 females, giving a sex ratio of 0.93 males per female. The median age was 41.0 years (compared with 37.4 years nationally), with 654 people (20.0%) aged under 15 years, 540 (16.5%) aged 15 to 29, 1,329 (40.6%) aged 30 to 64, and 753 (23.0%) aged 65 or older.

Ethnicities were 72.8% European/Pākehā, 20.5% Māori, 2.3% Pacific peoples, 15.5% Asian, and 2.3% other ethnicities. People may identify with more than one ethnicity.

The percentage of people born overseas was 28.0, compared with 27.1% nationally.

Although some people chose not to answer the census's question about religious affiliation, 42.9% had no religion, 43.1% were Christian, 3.0% were Hindu, 0.4% were Muslim, 0.6% were Buddhist and 3.4% had other religions.

Of those at least 15 years old, 594 (22.7%) people had a bachelor's or higher degree, and 513 (19.6%) people had no formal qualifications. The median income was $27,700, compared with $31,800 nationally. 390 people (14.9%) earned over $70,000 compared to 17.2% nationally. The employment status of those at least 15 was that 1,173 (44.7%) people were employed full-time, 321 (12.2%) were part-time, and 105 (4.0%) were unemployed.

Education
Pompallier Catholic College is a secondary (years 7-13) school with a roll of  students as of  It was founded in 1971 as a private boys' boarding school but became coeducational in 1977. In 1981 it closed the boarding facilities and became state integrated.

Maunu School is a contributing primary (years 1–6) school with a roll of  students as of  The school was established in 1884.

Both schools are coeducational.

Features

Barge Park Showgrounds on State Highway 14 is used for A&P shows, equestrian events and recreation.

There is a shopping complex on Tui Crescent, this includes a dairy, a pharmacy, and a takeaway shop.

There is also a cemetery located on 49 Cemetery Road. Maunu was first surveyed to be a cemetery in November 1892. In 1898 two hectares of land was vested in to the Maunu Cemetery Trusties until January 1922 when the Whangarei Borough Council took control. There have since been more additions to the cemetery.

Kiwi North

The Kiwi North precinct, located in Maunu, features the Whangarei Museum founded in 1890.

The site also includes Tuatara, Kiwi House and Heritage Park, incorporating the Clarke Homestead and other historical buildings relocated from around Whāngarei, the Northland Observatory, a garden centre and cafe, and various clubs and societies. The precinct features train rides and other events.

Notes

External links
 Maunu School website
 Pompallier Catholic College website

Suburbs of Whangārei